Friends 'Til the End is a 1997 television film directed by Jack Bender. It was originally broadcast January 20, 1997, on NBC.

Plot
Heather Romley (Shannen Doherty) and Suzanne Boxer (Jennifer Blanc) are both singers who have been competing against each other as long as they can remember. Usually, however, the more talented Heather won all the competitions, which resulted in Suzanne being insecure, going insane, and carrying a grudge against Heather, while being pushed by her stage mother.

Years later, Heather enrolls in college and hooks up with a boyfriend, Simon (Jason London). Suzanne, now using the alias of Zanne Armstrong, also enrolls in the same university, with the intention of destroying Heather's life. In the course of this insane evil revenge scheme, she becomes apparent best friends with Heather. But meanwhile, she is evilly destroying all Heather's friendships, and she even successfully seduces Simon himself. Heather is now being threatened with expulsion from college for plagiarism and is kicked out of her own band, with Zanne taking her place. Heather wants to take down Zanne, and sets out, with assistance, to prove Zanne's true identity—specifically, that "Zanne Armstrong's" real name is Suzanne Boxer, and that she is insane and indeed evil.

Cast
Shannen Doherty as Heather Romley
Jennifer Blanc as Zanne Armstrong/Suzanne Boxer
Jason London as Simon
Harriet Sansom Harris as Mrs. Boxer
John Livingston as Nick
Marisol Nichols as Alison
Gregory Itzin as Mr. Romley
Christine Healy as Mrs. Romley
Nicole Bilderback as Paige
Steven Martini as Bryan
Jenna Leigh Green as Risa
Harry J. Lennix as Prof. Gunderson
Shanna Moakler as Lisa

External links
Official website

1997 television films
1997 films
NBC network original films
Films about fraternities and sororities
Films directed by Jack Bender
Films scored by Christophe Beck
1990s English-language films